The Strangers Came is a 1949 British comedy film directed by Alfred Travers and starring Tommy Duggan, Shirl Conway and Shamus Locke. Some of the film was shot on location in Ireland. It was made as a second feature by the independent company Vandyke Productions.

Premise
Concerning a self-important American filmmaker who goes to a small Irish village with plans to make a movie about the life of St Patrick.

Cast
 Tommy Duggan as Stefan Wurlitz  
 Shirl Conway as Jane McDonald  
 Shamus Locke as Tom O'Flaherty  
 Tony Quinn as Hotelier  
 Reed De Rouen as Manager  
 Eve Eacott as Donna del Monte  
 Josephine Fitzgerald as Widow McDermott  
 Sheila Martin as Mary Laffey  
 Geoffrey Goodheart as Joe Bantham

References

Bibliography
 Chibnall, Steve & McFarlane, Brian. The British 'B' Film. Palgrave MacMillan, 2009.

External links

1949 films
British comedy films
1949 comedy films
Films shot in Ireland
Films set in Ireland
British black-and-white films
1940s English-language films
1940s British films